The Pahlavas are a people mentioned in ancient Indian texts like the Manu Smriti, various Puranas, the Ramayana, the Mahabharata, and the Brihat Samhita. According to P. Carnegy, In the 4th century BCE, Vartika of Katyayana mentions the Sakah-Parthavah demonstrating an awareness of these Saka-Parthians, probably by way of commerce.

Literary references

In Puranic texts
Pahlavas are referenced in various Puranic texts like Vayu Purana, Brahmanda Purana, Markendeya Purana, Matsya Purana, Vamana Purana etc.

Kirfel's list of  Uttarapatha countries of the Bhuvanakosha locates the Pahlavas along with the Tusharas, Chinas, Angalaukikas, Barbaras, Kambojas, Daradas, Bahlikas and other countries of the Udichya division of ancient India. e.g.:

ete desha udichyastu
Kambojashchaiva Dardashchaiva Barbarashcha Angaukikah ||
Chinashchaiva Tusharashcha Pahlavadhayata narah ||.

The Vayu Purana, Brahamanda Purana and several other Puranas mention the Pahlavas with the tribes of Uttarapatha or north-west. The 6th century CE text Markendeya Purana  lists the Pahlavas, Kambojas, Daradas, Bahlikas, Barbaras, Tusharas, Paradas, Chinas, Lampakas etc. as the countries of Udichya division i.e. Uttarapatha, but 58th chapter of the Markendeya Purana also refers to yet other settlements of the Pahlavas and the Kambojas and locates them both specifically in the south-west of India as neighbors to the Sindhu, Sauvira and Anarta (north Saurashtra) countries. Further the 6th century Brhatsamhita of Varaha Mihira also locates the Pahlavas and Kamboja kingdoms in south-west India i.e. around Gujarat/Saurashtra.

Puranas like Vayu also state that the Udichyas including the Pahlavas, Paradas, Gandharas, Sakas, Yavanas, Tusharas, Kambojas, Khasas, Lampakas, Madhyadesis, Vindhyas, Aprantas, Dakshinatyas, Dravidas, Pulindas, Simhalas etc. would be proceeded against and annihilated by Kalki in Kali Yuga. And they are stated to have been annihilated by king Pramiti at the end of Kali age as per Puranic evidence.

According to Vayu Purana and Matsya Purana, river Chakshu (Oxus or Amu Darya) flowed through the countries of Pahlavas, Tusharas, Lampakas, Paradas and the Sakas etc.

Pānca Ganahas or Five Hordes
Puranas associate the Pahlavas with the Kambojas, Sakas, Yavanas and Paradas and brands them together as Panca-ganah (five-hordes). These five hordes were military allies of the Haihaya or Taljunga Kshatriyas of Yadava line and were chiefly responsible for dethroning king Bahu of Kosala. Later, king Sagara, son of king Bahu, was able to defeat the Haihayas or Taljungas together with these five-hordes. According to Puranic accounts, king Sagara had divested the Paradas and other members of the well-known Pānca-gana (i.e. the Sakas, Yavanas, Kambojas and Pahlavas) of their Kshatriyahood and turned them into the Mlechchas. Before their defeat at the hands of king Sagara, these five-hordes were called Kshatriya-pungava (i.e. foremost among the Kshatriyas).

In the Ramayana
The Balakanda of the Ramayana groups the Pahlavas with the Sakas, Kambojas, Yavanas, Mlechhas and the Kiratas and refers to them as military allies of sage Vasishtha against Vedic sage king Vishwamitra.

The Kiskindha Kanda of Ramayana  associates the Pahlavas with the Yavanas, Shakas, Kambojas, Paradas (Varadas), Rishikas and the Uttarakurus etc. and locates them all in the trans-Himalayan territories i.e. in the Sakadvipa.

In the Mahabharata

In the Uttarapatha
Mahabharata attests that Pandava-putra Nakula had defeated the Pahlavas in the course of his western expedition. The kings of Pahlava were also present at the Rajasuya sacrifice of king Yudhishtra.

The Mahabharata also associates the Pahlavas with the Sakas, Yavanas, Gandharas, Kambojas, Tusharas, Sabaras, Barbaras, etc. and addresses them all as the barbaric tribes of Uttarapatha.

In the Udyoga-Parva
But the Udyoga-Parva of Mahabharata groups the Pahlavas with the Sakas, Paradas and the Kambojas-Rishikas and  locates them all in/around Anupa region in western India.

Mahabharata reads: These kings of the Shakas, Pahlavas and Daradas (i.e. the Paradas) and the Kamboja Rshikas, these are in the western riverine (Anupa) area.

This epic reference implies that sections of the Pahlavas, Sakas, Paradas, Kambojas were also located in western India near Saurashtra/Maharashtra.

In Kurukshetra War

The Pahlavas along with the Sakas, Kiratas, Yavanas etc. joined Saradwat's son Kripacharya, the high-souled and mighty bowman, and took up their positions at the northern point of the army.

In the Manusmriti
Manusmriti states that the Pahlavas and several other tribes like the Sakas, Yavanas, Kambojas, Paradas, Daradas, Khasas, etc. were originally noble Kshatriyas, but later, due to their non-observance of valorous Kshatriya codes and neglect of chivalry, they had gradually sunken to the status of Mlechchas.

In the Mudrarakshas Drama
The Buddhist drama Mudrarakshas by Visakhadutta and the Jaina works Parishishtaparvan refer to Chandragupta's alliance with Himalayan king Parvatka. This Himalayan alliance gave Chandragupta a powerful composite army made up of the frontier martial tribes of the Shakas, Kambojas, Yavanas, Pahlavas, Bahlikas etc. which he utilised to defeat the Greek successors of Alexander and thus expanded his Mauryan Empire in northern India.

In the Brihat-Katha-Manjari
The Brihat-Katha-Manjari of the Kshmendra relates that around 400, the Gupta king Vikramaditya (Chandragupta II) had "unburdened the sacred earth of the barbarians" like the Shakas, Mlecchas, Kambojas, Yavanas, Tusharas, Parasikas, Hunas, etc. by annihilating these "unrighteous people" completely.

In the Kavyamimamsa
The 10th century Kavyamimamsa of Pt Raj Shekhar still lists the Sakas, Tusharas, Vokanas, Hunas, Kambojas, Bahlikas, Pahlavas, Tangana, Turukshas, etc. together and states them as the tribes located in the Uttarapatha division.

See also
 Achaemenid conquest of the Indus Valley

References

Sources
 

Exotic tribes in Hindu scripture